Carrie & Lowell is the seventh studio album by American musician Sufjan Stevens. It was released on March 31, 2015, by Asthmatic Kitty. It is executively produced by Stevens, and features guest contributions from Thomas Bartlett, Sean Carey, Casey Foubert, Ben Lester, Nedelle Torrisi, and Laura Veirs.

Unlike Stevens' previous album, the electronic The Age of Adz (2010), Carrie & Lowell features sparse instrumentation, with critics noting it as reminiscent of the performer's earlier indie folk-inspired material. Lyrically, the album sees him explore the fallout from the 2012 death of his mother Carrie, and the relationship between Stevens and Carrie’s second husband Lowell Brams, who helped Stevens found Asthmatic Kitty.

Carrie & Lowell was supported by the lead singles "No Shade in the Shadow of the Cross" and "Should Have Known Better". The album saw word-of-mouth marketing through its one-week preview on NPR, and after the song "Death with Dignity" featured in the video games Life Is Strange 2 (2018) and The Awesome Adventures of Captain Spirit (2018). Stevens later supported the album through the Carrie & Lowell Tour, which spanned North America, Europe, and Australasia.

Carrie & Lowell received immediate widespread critical success, with many labeling it Stevens' best, and it was routinely named among the best albums of 2015 in many publications' year-end lists. Commercially, Carrie & Lowell debuted and peaked at number ten on the US Billboard 200 with 53,000 equivalent album units, of which 51,000 came from pure sales; as of July 2015, the album has sold 105,000 units in the US, with almost half sold on vinyl.

Recording
The songs on the album were recorded in 2014 at Stevens' office in Dumbo, Brooklyn and Pat Dillett's studio in Midtown Manhattan. Some of the songs were also recorded in Oregon, at Portland's Flora Recording & Playback and on an iPhone in a Klamath Falls hotel room. A few songs were also tracked in Oklahoma, at Norman's Blackwatch Studios, and in Wisconsin, at Eau Claire's April Base Studios. The songs were inspired by the 2012 death of his mother, Carrie, and the family trips they took to Oregon in Stevens' childhood. Stevens' mother, who suffered from depression, schizophrenia, and substance abuse, abandoned him when he was a year old. According to Stevens, recording the album helped him come to terms with her death and provide closure. The album title also references his stepfather, Lowell, who helped co-found Stevens' record company Asthmatic Kitty.

The album was produced by Thomas Bartlett, known as Doveman, a musician and friend of Stevens who had recently lost a brother to cancer. Of Bartlett's production role, Stevens said, "Thomas took all these sketches and made sense of it all. He called me out on my bullshit. He said: 'These are your songs. This is your record.' He was ruthless." In the same interview, on the emotions in the album's recording process, Stevens said:

Commercial performance
Carrie & Lowell debuted at number ten on the Billboard 200 with 53,000 equivalent album units; it sold 51,000 copies in its first week, with the remainder of its unit count reflecting the album's streaming activity and track sales. The album also debuted at number 10 on the Canadian Albums Chart with sales of 4,400. As of July 2015, Carrie & Lowell has sold 105,000 copies in the United States, with 44,900 of its total having been sold in the vinyl configuration.

As of June 2017 it was certified silver by British Phonographic Industry for 60,000 sold units in UK.

Critical reception

Carrie & Lowell received universal acclaim from critics, noted at review aggregator Metacritic. It has a weighted average score of 90 out of 100, based on 40 reviews. It was the second-best rated album of 2015 on the site. Album of the Year surveyed 42critics and gave Carrie & Lowell a 90 out of 100, making it the third-best reviewed album of the year; AnyDecentMusic? summed up critical consensus as 8.8 out of 10, based on 43reviews. In 2020, Consequence of Sound ranked several of Stevens' studio albums, with this one as the best.

Andrew Hannah of The 405 proclaimed that "Carrie & Lowell is just the latest in a long line of unimpeachable achievements." In his review for Pitchfork, writer Brandon Stosuy wrote, "Sufjan Stevens' new album, Carrie & Lowell, is his best." Stephen Carlick of Exclaim! called the record "a quietly triumphant return for Stevens, announced not by fireworks but by a series of small, elegant moments that reach for the heart." Writing for The Boston Globe, James Reed praised the album's lyrics as well as the instrumentation, writing that he would listen to just the instrumentals.

Track listing
All songs written by Sufjan Stevens
"Death with Dignity" – 3:59
"Should Have Known Better" – 5:07
"All of Me Wants All of You" – 3:41
"Drawn to the Blood" – 3:18
"Eugene" – 2:26
"Fourth of July" – 4:39
"The Only Thing" – 4:44
"Carrie & Lowell" – 3:14
"John My Beloved" – 5:04
"No Shade in the Shadow of the Cross" – 2:40
"Blue Bucket of Gold" – 4:43

Personnel
Performance
 Sufjan Stevens – vocals, guitar, mixing
 Thomas Bartlett – vocals, mixing, piano on "Should Have Known Better"
 Sean Carey
 Casey Foubert
 Ben Lester
 Nedelle Torrisi
 Laura Veirs – backing vocals on "Should Have Known Better"

Technical personnel
 Josh Bonati – mastering and vinyl cutting
 Pat Dillett – mixing
 Chad Copelin – engineering (at Black Watch)
 Jarod Evans – engineering (at Black Watch)
 Brian Joseph – engineering (April Base)
 Tucker Martine – engineering (at Flora)

Carrie & Lowell Live

Carrie & Lowell Live is a live album and concert film released on April 28, 2017 through Asthmatic Kitty. It was recorded live at North Charleston Performing Arts Center, South Carolina on November 9, 2015 during the Carrie & Lowell Tour. The performance was filmed and produced by We Are Films and features many new interpretations, re-workings, and expansions of the songs from Carrie & Lowell. The full concert film was made available to stream for free on Vimeo and YouTube.

"Redford (For Yia-Yia and Pappou)" – 3:27
"Death with Dignity" – 4:07
"Should Have Known Better" – 6:04
"All of Me Wants All of You" – 6:30
"John My Beloved" – 5:49
"The Only Thing" – 5:42
"Fourth of July" – 6:41
"No Shade in the Shadow of the Cross" – 3:34
"Carrie & Lowell" – 4:38
"Drawn to the Blood" – 4:27
"Eugene" – 2:52
"Vesuvius" – 8:14
"Futile Devices" – 3:36
"Blue Bucket of Gold" – 5:35
"Blue Bucket Outro" – 12:46
"Hotline Bling" (Drake cover, encore, featuring Gallant) – 4:44

Charts

Charts

Weekly charts

Year-end charts

Certifications

See also

The Greatest Gift (Sufjan Stevens album), a 2017 mixtape album by Stevens from sessions for this album.

References

External links

Page from Asthmatic Kitty

2015 albums
Asthmatic Kitty albums
Sufjan Stevens albums
Concept albums
Oregon in fiction
Lo-fi music albums